Graphis is a genus of medium-sized sea snails, marine gastropod molluscs in the family Cimidae.

Species
The species within this genus include:
 Graphis albida (Kanmacher, 1798)
 Graphis ambigua (Weisbord, 1962)
 Graphis barashi van Aartsen, 2002
 Graphis blanda (Finlay, 1924)
 Graphis eikenboomi van der Linden & Moolenbeek, 2004
 Graphis gracilis (Monterosato, 1874)
 Graphis lightbourni van der Linden & Moolenbeek, 2004
 Graphis menkhorsti De Jong & Coomans, 1988
 Graphis pacifica Bandel, 2005
 Graphis perrierae Barros, Lima Silva Mello, Barros, Lima, Do Carmo Ferrão Santos, Cabral & Padovan, 2003
 Graphis pruinosa Gofas & Rueda, 2014
 Graphis sculpturata (Oliver, 1915)
 Graphis striata (Jeffreys, 1884)
 Graphis underwoodae Bartsch, 1947

References

 Jeffreys J. G. (1862-1869). British Conchology. London, van Voorst : Vol. 1: pp. CXIV + 341 [1862]. Vol. 2: pp. 479 [1864] Il frontrespizio reca la data 1863 ma in effetti pubblicato nel 1864. Vol. 3: pp. 394 [1865]. Vol. 4: pp. 487 [1867]. Vol. 5: pp. 259 [1869] page(s): vol. 4 p. 102.

Cimidae